Pot of Gold and similar terms may refer to:

Pot of Gold (Mars), a rock on the planet Mars
A leprechaun's pot of gold, in Irish mythology

Brands and enterprises
Pot of Gold, a brand of chocolate  manufactured by The Hershey Company

Art, entertainment, and media

Film, TV, theatre, radio
Aulularia (translated as The Pot of Gold), an Ancient Roman play by Plautus
 Pot of Gold (TV series), an Australian television talent show
 Pot o' Gold (film), the 1941 film about the 1939 radio program 
 "Pot o' Gold" (Glee), a Glee TV series episode
 Pot o' Gold (radio program), the 1939 radio program that was radio's first big-money giveaway

Music

Record Label
Pot of Gold, reggae label founded in Kingston, Jamaica, by Richie Stephens

Albums
Pot of Gold, 1993 album by Richie Stephens on Motown Records.
Pot of Gold (album), a 2002 compilation album by rock band Rainbow
Pot of Gold, 2008 album by British neo-soul singer Alice Russell

Songs
"Pot of Gold" (Akon song), 2005
"Pot of Gold" (Game song), 2011
 "Pot of Gold", a song by Juliet Richardson from Random Order (2005)
 "Pot of Gold, a song by Asher Roth from RetroHash (2014)

See also
Crock of Gold (disambiguation)
See Rainbows in culture for the belief about a pot of gold at the end of a rainbow